Ralph Byron Horner (June 26, 1884 – December 14, 1964) was a Canadian Senator, farmer, businessman and the patriarch of a Western Canadian political family.

Born in North Clarendon, Quebec, Horner and his family settled in Blaine Lake, Saskatchewan.

A Conservative activist and twice failed provincial candidate, Horner was appointed to the board of the Canadian National Railway by the government of R.B. Bennett in 1931. In 1933, Bennett appointed Horner to the Senate where he served for over 30 years until his death in 1964 as the Senator for Saskatchewan North.

In the 1958 general election two of his sons, Jack Horner and Hugh Horner and his nephew Albert Horner were all elected to the House of Commons of Canada as Progressive Conservatives. Four Horners thus sat in Parliament simultaneously (though in different chambers) until Ralph Horner's death in 1964. (In 1972 a third son, Norval Horner, was elected).

References

External links
 

1884 births
1964 deaths
Progressive Conservative Party of Canada senators
Conservative Party of Canada (1867–1942) senators
Canadian senators from Saskatchewan
People from Blaine Lake, Saskatchewan
Ralph
Anglophone Quebec people